Silas Lee Copeland (April 2, 1920 – December 4, 2001) was a United States Army soldier who served as the third Sergeant Major of the Army. He was sworn in on October 1, 1970, and served until June, 1973.

Early life
Copeland was born in Embryfield, Texas (now Staley, Texas), on April 2, 1920.

Military career
After serving at various posts in the United States, Copeland was sent overseas in January 1945 and assigned to Company E, 66th Armored Regiment, 2nd Armored Division, as a tank commander and later a tank platoon sergeant. In late 1945, he returned from Germany and was stationed at Fort Hood, Texas, where he became Operations and Intelligence Sergeant of the 67th Tank Battalion and 82d Reconnaissance Battalion. In 1950 he joined the 2d Battalion, 8th Cavalry Regiment, 1st Cavalry Division, then located in Japan. From there, his unit was moved into Korea on July 18, 1950, making the landing by assault boats. He served as the Reconnaissance and Intelligence Platoon Sergeant and Battalion Operations Sergeant.

From 1951 to 1953, Copeland was assigned to Senior Reserve Officers' Training Corps duty at Texas A&M University. In 1953 was assigned to the 2d Battalion, 22d Infantry Regiment, Germany, as a first sergeant. He remained with that unit until November 1954 when he was reassigned to the 1st Armored Division at Fort Hood, Texas as Operations Sergeant and sergeant major of the 4th Tank Battalion. In 1957 he was selected as an instructor, Senior Reserve Officers' Training Corps, Centenary College of Louisiana at Shreveport, Louisiana. Upon completion of his tour of duty at Centenary, he was assigned to the 3d Reconnaissance Squadron, 8th Cavalry, 8th Infantry Division in Germany as sergeant major and remained until he was reassigned to the 2d Armored Division, Fort Hood, Texas in October 1962.

Selected to be the division sergeant major in June 1963, Copeland remained in that position until December 1966 when he was transferred to the 2nd Brigade, 4th Armored Division in Erlangen, Germany. He was selected as the division command sergeant major in April 1968 and served in that capacity until July 1969 when he was assigned to the Republic of Vietnam as the division command sergeant major of the 1st Infantry Division (Big Red One). For seven and a half months he performed duties as the division's command sergeant major until the 1st Infantry Division returned from Vietnam. Copeland accompanied the division colors to Fort Riley, Kansas, then returned to Vietnam to complete his tour as command sergeant major of the 4th Infantry Division located in the Central Highlands of Vietnam. Following his return to the United States, Copeland was appointed Sergeant Major of the Army on October 1, 1970.

Later life
Copeland died on December 4, 2001, and was buried in Oakwood Cemetery, Huntsville, Texas.

Awards and decorations

 5 Overseas Service Bars.
 10 Service stripes.

References

 

1920 births
2001 deaths
People from San Jacinto County, Texas
United States Army personnel of World War II
United States Army personnel of the Korean War
United States Army personnel of the Vietnam War
Recipients of the Legion of Merit
Recipients of the Distinguished Flying Cross (United States)
Recipients of the Air Medal
Sergeants Major of the Army